The 2022 German Open (officially known as the Yonex Gainward German Open 2022 for sponsorship reasons) was a badminton tournament that took place at the Westenergie Sporthalle in Mülheim, Germany, from 8 to 13 March 2022 and had a total prize pool of $180,000.

Tournament
The 2022 German Open was the fourth tournament of the 2022 BWF World Tour and was part of the German Open championships, which had been held since 1955. The tournament was organized by the German Badminton Association with sanction from the Badminton World Federation.

Venue
This international tournament was held at the Westenergie Sporthalle at Mülheim, Germany.

Point distribution
Below is the point distribution table for each phase of the tournament based on the BWF points system for the BWF World Tour Super 300 event.

Prize pool
The total prize money for this tournament was US$180,000. The distribution of the prize money was in accordance with BWF regulations.

Men's singles

Seeds 

 Viktor Axelsen (semi-finals)
 Kento Momota (first round)
 Anders Antonsen (withdrew)
 Anthony Sinisuka Ginting (second round)
 Lee Zii Jia (semi-finals)
 Jonatan Christie (second round)
 Ng Ka Long (first round)
 Srikanth Kidambi (quarter-finals)

Finals

Top half

Section 1

Section 2

Bottom half

Section 3

Section 4

Women's singles

Seeds 

 Tai Tzu-ying (second round)
 Akane Yamaguchi (second round)
 Chen Yufei (final)
 An Se-young (semi-finals)
 Nozomi Okuhara (withdrew)
 Carolina Marín (withdrew)
 P. V. Sindhu (second round)
 Ratchanok Intanon (quarter-finals)

Finals

Top half

Section 1

Section 2

Bottom half

Section 3

Section 4

Men's doubles

Seeds 

 Takuro Hoki / Yugo Kobayashi (quarter-finals)
 Aaron Chia / Soh Wooi Yik (withdrew)
 Satwiksairaj Rankireddy / Chirag Shetty (withdrew)
 Fajar Alfian / Muhammad Rian Ardianto (second round)
 Kim Astrup / Anders Skaarup Rasmussen (semi-finals)
 Ong Yew Sin / Teo Ee Yi (quarter-finals)
 Vladimir Ivanov / Ivan Sozonov (Banned)
 Mark Lamsfuß / Marvin Seidel (second round)

Finals

Top half

Section 1

Section 2

Bottom half

Section 3

Section 4

Women's doubles

Seeds 

 Chen Qingchen / Jia Yifan (champions)
 Lee So-hee / Shin Seung-chan (second round)
 Kim So-yeong / Kong Hee-yong (quarter-finals)
 Mayu Matsumoto / Wakana Nagahara (withdrew)
 Nami Matsuyama / Chiharu Shida (second round)
 Jongkolphan Kititharakul / Rawinda Prajongjai (semi-finals)
 Gabriela Stoeva / Stefani Stoeva (final)
 Pearly Tan / Thinaah Muralitharan (first round)

Finals

Top half

Section 1

Section 2

Bottom half

Section 3

Section 4

Mixed doubles

Seeds 

 Dechapol Puavaranukroh / Sapsiree Taerattanachai (champions)
 Wang Yilyu / Huang Dongping (second round)
 Yuta Watanabe / Arisa Higashino (first round)
 Praveen Jordan / Melati Daeva Oktavianti (withdrew)
 Marcus Ellis / Lauren Smith (semi-finals)
 Tan Kian Meng / Lai Pei Jing (quarter-finals)
 Thom Gicquel / Delphine Delrue (quarter-finals)
 Goh Soon Huat / Shevon Jemie Lai (first round)

Finals

Top half

Section 1

Section 2

Bottom half

Section 3

Section 4

References

External links
 Tournament Link

German Open (badminton)
German Open
German Open (badminton)
German Open